The South Africa women's national handball team is the national team handball team of South Africa. It is governed by the South African Handball Federation and takes part in international handball competitions.

African Championship record
1998 – 6th

External links
IHF profile

Women's national handball teams
Handball
National team